(also   , 1525–1604) was a Ming period Neo-Confucian philosopher. He introduced into Chinese philosophy the well-known "Yin and Yang symbol", the taijitu (a "diagram of the great ultimate").
Lai Zhide is the author of an I Ching commentary, the  Explanation of the Classic of Change Annotated by Mr Lai (ed. Zheng Can 1988).

See also
Li Zhi (Ming Dynasty)
Zhou Dun-yi, an 11th-century Neo-Confucian who had also presented a taijitu

References

1525 births
1604 deaths
Ming dynasty philosophers
Chinese Confucianists
Neo-Confucian scholars
Ming dynasty writers
Philosophers from Chongqing
Writers from Chongqing
16th-century Chinese philosophers
Ming dynasty classicists